Ed Carlos de Arruda Amorim (born 19 March 2001), known as Ed Carlos, is a Brazilian footballer who plays as an attacking midfielder for Santos.

Club career

Early career
Born in São Paulo, Ed Carlos joined São Paulo's youth setup in 2015, after representing São Caetano and Portuguesa. In October 2018, he was named by English newspaper The Guardian as one of the best players born in 2001 worldwide.

On 30 June 2021, after nearly eight years at the club, he left as his contract expired.

Santos
On 3 August 2021, Ed Carlos signed for Santos, being initially assigned to the under-20 squad. Despite impressing in the 2022 Copa São Paulo de Futebol Júnior, he trained separately until being involved with the main squad only in July 2022 by interim manager Marcelo Fernandes.

Ed Carlos made his first team – and Série A – on 1 October 2022, coming on as a late substitute for Carlos Sánchez in a 1–0 away loss against Internacional. Late in the month, after being a starter in the previous matches, he suffered a shoulder injury which kept him out for the remainder of the season.

On 14 February 2023, Ed Carlos renewed his contract with Santos until June 2026.

Career statistics

References

External links
Santos FC profile 

2001 births
Living people
Footballers from São Paulo
Brazilian footballers
Association football midfielders
Campeonato Brasileiro Série A players
Santos FC players